Statistics Denmark defines towns or cities as areas with more than 200 residents in a continuous settlement with no more than 200 meters between residential structures. In 2016 there were 20 such areas in Aarhus Municipality, the largest being the city of Aarhus with some 260.000 inhabitants while some 50.000 people lived in urban areas elsewhere in the municipality. In 2013 Beder and Malling were officially counted as a single conurbation for the first time. Towns in the municipality are generally considered satellites of Aarhus. 

Population by year

 Stavtrup was incorporated in Aarhus in 2011
 In 2013 Malling and Beder officially merged to form the new town of Beder-Malling

References